Lopik is a municipality and a town in the Netherlands, in the province of Utrecht, close to the Lek river.

History 
Lopik lies within the Lopikerwaard region, which used to be occupied by swamps and forests until the area was cultivated in the eleventh century. Lopik was first mentioned as "Lobeke" in 1155 CE. Most of the population settled along the canals that were used for transport and drainage (and which are still used for the latter purpose). It was not until after World War II that villages in the area were expanded beyond the original ribbons of buildings, and Lopik remains a well-known example of a linear settlement within the Netherlands.

In the Netherlands, "Lopik" is often used as a reference to the broadcasting facilities located in the eastern part of the municipality and in neighbouring IJsselstein. These include the Gerbrandy Tower, a structure that is the tallest structure in the Netherlands, and the world's largest Christmas tree during the period around Christmas.

Geography 
The entire municipality lies within the Dutch Green Heart and has a rural character. The two main access roads are the N210 and N204 provincial roads, which connect the area with major cities that include Rotterdam and Utrecht. The river Lek lies behind a high dike, which is visible from most of the south of the Lopik municipality. In the end of the eighties and early nineties the dike was strengthened and extra height was added in preparation for increasingly high water levels. Ambitious planning for continued improvement to the dikes continues.

Population centres 
The municipality of Lopik consists of the following towns, villages and/or districts:

Topography

Dutch topographic map of the municipality of Lopik, June 2015

Transport

Public transport in the region primarily consists of bus connections, which are mainly carried out by Syntus. The nearest railway stations are in Gouda and Woerden.

Notable residents

 Paul Theodor van Brussel (1754 in Zuid-Polsbroek – 1795) a Dutch flower painter
 Herman de Man (1898–1946) a Dutch novelist, grew up in Lopikerwaard
 Mineke Schipper (born 1938 in Polsbroek) a Dutch author of non-fiction and fiction and scholar
 Kees van Ieperen (born 1956 in Lopikerkapel) a retired skeet shooter, competed at the 1980 Summer Olympics
 Ton Strien (born 1958 in Lopik) a Dutch politician
 Tjaarke Maas (1974 in Lopik – 2004) a Dutch painter, partic. of Russian sacred art
 Peter Schep (born 1977 in Lopik) a Dutch racing track endurance cyclist
 Kees van Buuren (born 1986 in Lopik) a retired Dutch footballer with 230 club caps
 Ellen Visee (born 1980 in Lopik) winner of the Greenberry Pubquiz 2021

Gallery

References

External links 

Official website

 
Municipalities of Utrecht (province)
Populated places in Utrecht (province)